Gone is a book by Mo Hayder and published by Grove Atlantic on 4 February 2010 which later went on to win the Edgar Award for Best Novel in 2012.

Synopsis
When a carjacker drives off with a child in the back seat, detective inspector Jack Caffery realizes that the child was the criminal's true target.

References 

Edgar Award-winning works
2010 novels
British mystery novels